Hesperaloe parviflora, also known as red yucca, hummingbird yucca, redflower false yucca and samandoque, is a plant that is native to Chihuahuan desert of west Texas east and south into central and south Texas and northeastern Mexico around Coahuila.

The Latin specific epithet parviflora means "with small flowers".

This species has become popular in xeriscape landscape design for public and private gardens in California and the Southwestern United States.
The plant's qualities include drought tolerance, heat resistance, low maintenance needs, hummingbird attracting flowers, and an architectural form. It also is a spineless alternative to Agave and Yucca horticultural species.

References

External links
 
 

Agavoideae
Flora of the Chihuahuan Desert
Flora of Coahuila
Flora of Texas
Plants described in 1894
Taxa named by John Merle Coulter
Garden plants of North America
Bird food plants
Drought-tolerant plants